First Source - Orthopedic Surgery being a "choice."

Second source - Orthopedic Surgery 

The following outline is provided as an overview of and topical guide to trauma and orthopaedics:

Orthopedic surgery – branch of surgery concerned with conditions involving the musculoskeletal system. Orthopedic surgeons use both surgical and nonsurgical means to treat musculoskeletal injuries, sports injuries, degenerative diseases, infections, bone tumours, and congenital limb deformities.  Trauma surgery and traumatology is a sub-specialty dealing with the operative management of fractures, major trauma and the multiply-injured patient.

Branches of trauma and orthopaedics 
Elective
Foot and ankle
Soft-tissue knee reconstruction
Knee arthroplasty
Hip arthroplasty
Spinal
Upper limb (shoulder & elbow)
Wrist & hand
Osteosarcoma and limb reconstruction
Peripheral nerve injury
Trauma surgery
Paediatric and congenital osteochondrodysplasia

History of trauma and orthopaedics 

History of trauma and orthopaedics

General trauma and orthopaedics concepts 
Principles of managing trauma
Advanced trauma life support
Emergency management
Triage
Basic sciences in orthopaedics
Anatomy
Cartilage
Bone
Osseous tissue
Cortical bone, Cancellous bone
Epiphysis, Metaphysis, Diaphysis
Long bone, Short bone, Flat bone, Irregular bone, Sesamoid bone
Joint
Synovial joint
Fibrous joint
Cartilaginous joint
Physiology
Bone healing
Ossification
Pathology
Bone fracture
Spiral fracture, Avulsion fracture, Stress fracture, Burst fracture, Compression fracture
Pathologic fracture
Arthritis
Osteoarthritis
Septic arthritis
Osteochondropathy
Osteopathies (Osteoporosis, Osteomyelitis, Pseudarthrosis)
Chondropathies
Sarcomas
Bone tumor (Osteoma)
Cartilage tumor (Chondroma)
Orthopaedic principles
Diagnostics
Examination
Radiography
Reduction
Splinting and casting
Traction
Fixation
Internal fixation
Intramedullary rod
External fixation
Rehabilitation
Physical therapy
Orthotics
Descriptive terms
Displacement
Comminution
General procedure types
Arthroplasty
Arthrocentesis
Osteotomy
Distraction osteogenesis
Bone grafting
Arthrodesis
Biomechanics
List of orthopedic implants
Computer-assisted orthopedic surgery

Trauma and Orthopaedics organizations 
British Orthopaedic Association
American Academy of Orthopaedic Surgeons
AO Foundation

Trauma and Orthopaedics publications 
Journal of Bone and Joint Surgery
 Journal of Orthopedics
 Journal of Orthopedic Trauma
 Journal of the American Academy of Orthopedic Sciences
 Journal of the American Podiatric Medical Association
 Clinical Journal of Sport medicine
 New England Journal of medicine

Persons influential in trauma and orthopaedics 
Hugh Owen Thomas, b. 1834, d. 1891 (aged 56), Welsh surgeon considered the father of orthopaedic surgery in Britain

Jean-Andre Venel, b. 1740, d. 1791 (aged 50), Swiss doctor and a pioneer in the field of orthopedics

John Hunter, b. 1728, d. 1793 (aged 64), Scottish surgeon

Percivall Pott, b. 1714, d. 1788 (aged 73), English surgeon, one of the founders of orthopedy

Robert Jones, b. 1857, d. 1933 (aged 75), British surgeon pioneering the use of x-rays

John Charnley, b. 1911, d. 1982 (aged 70), English pioneer of hip replacements

Nicolas Andry, b. 1658, d. 1742 (aged 83), French physician

References

External links 

Orthopedics
Traumatology
Trauma and Orthopaedics
Trauma and Orthopaedics